The 2007–08 OHL season was the 28th season of the Ontario Hockey League. Twenty teams played 68 games each during the schedule, that started on September 19, 2007, and concluded on March 16, 2008. The Mississauga IceDogs relocated to the Gatorade Garden City Complex in downtown St. Catharines after getting approval of the team's sale to Bill Burke by the Board of Governors on June 5, 2007. The team was renamed the Niagara IceDogs. The Toronto St. Michael's Majors replaced the IceDogs in the Hershey Centre, renaming themselves, the Mississauga St. Michael's Majors. The Kingston Frontenacs moved late-season from the Kingston Memorial Centre to the new K-Rock Centre, which opened on February 22, 2008. On the afternoon of February 18, 2008, Windsor Spitfires team captain Mickey Renaud died after collapsing at his home, at age 19, of the rare heart condition hypertrophic cardiomyopathy. The playoffs began March 20, with the Kitchener Rangers winning the J. Ross Robertson Cup as OHL champions. The Rangers were also chosen before the start of the season to host the 2008 Memorial Cup tournament.

Regular season

Final standings
Note: DIV = Division; GP = Games played; W = Wins; L = Losses; OTL = Overtime losses; SL = Shootout losses; GF = Goals for; GA = Goals against; PTS = Points; x = clinched playoff berth; y = clinched division title; z = clinched conference title

Eastern conference

Western conference

Scoring leaders
Note: GP = Games played; G = Goals; A = Assists; Pts = Points; PIM = Penalty minutes

Leading goaltenders
Note: GP = Games played; Mins = Minutes played; W = Wins; L = Losses: OTL = Overtime losses; SL = Shootout losses; GA = Goals Allowed; SO = Shutouts; GAA = Goals against average

Playoffs

Conference quarterfinals
Eastern conference

Western conference

Conference semifinals
Eastern conference

Western conference

Conference finals

J. Ross Robertson Cup

J. Ross Robertson Cup Champions Roster

Playoff scoring leaders 
Note: GP = Games played; G = Goals; A = Assists; Pts = Points; PIM = Penalty minutes

Playoff leading goaltenders 
Note: GP = Games played; Mins = Minutes played; W = Wins; L = Losses: OTL = Overtime losses; SL = Shootout losses; GA = Goals Allowed; SO = Shutouts; GAA = Goals against average

All-Star teams

First team
Justin Azevedo, Centre, Kitchener Rangers
Brett MacLean, Left Wing, Oshawa Generals
Matthew Halischuk, Right Wing, Kitchener Rangers
Drew Doughty, Defence, Guelph Storm
Zach Bogosian, Defence, Peterborough Petes
Mike Murphy, Goaltender, Belleville Bulls
Bob Boughner, Coach, Windsor Spitfires

Second team
Steven Stamkos, Centre, Sarnia Sting
Luca Caputi, Left Wing, Niagara IceDogs
Stefan Legein, Right Wing, Niagara IceDogs
Bob Sanguinetti, Defence, Brampton Battalion
Yannick Weber, Defence, Kitchener Rangers
Steve Mason, Goaltender, Kitchener Rangers
Peter DeBoer, Coach, Kitchener Rangers

Third team
Shawn Matthias, Centre, Belleville Bulls
Matt Beleskey, Left Wing, Belleville Bulls
Wayne Simmonds, Right Wing, Sault Ste. Marie Greyhounds
Alex Pietrangelo, Defence, Niagara IceDogs
Ryan Wilson, Defence, Sarnia Sting
Thomas McCollum, Goaltender, Guelph Storm
George Burnett, Coach, Belleville Bulls

All-Star Classic
The OHL All-Star Classic was played February 6, 2008 at the Steelback Centre in Sault Ste. Marie, won 8–7 in a shootout by the Eastern Conference. The skills competition was held the previous night on February 5, with the Eastern Conference winning 19–18.

Awards

2008 OHL Priority Selection
On May 3, 2008, the OHL conducted the 2008 Ontario Hockey League Priority Selection. The Sudbury Wolves held the first overall pick in the draft, and selected John McFarland from the Toronto Jr. Canadiens. McFarland was awarded the Jack Ferguson Award, awarded to the top pick in the draft.

Below are the players who were selected in the first round of the 2008 Ontario Hockey League Priority Selection.

2008 CHL Import Draft
On June 29, 2008, the Canadian Hockey League conducted the 2008 CHL Import Draft, in which teams in all three CHL leagues participate in. The Sudbury Wolves held the first pick in the draft by a team in the OHL, and selected Nikita Filatov from Russia with their selection.

Below are the players who were selected in the first round by Ontario Hockey League teams in the 2008 CHL Import Draft.

2008 NHL Entry Draft
On June 20–21, 2008, the National Hockey League conducted the 2008 NHL Entry Draft held at Scotiabank Place in Ottawa, Ontario. In total, 46 players from the Ontario Hockey League were selected in the draft. Steven Stamkos of the Sarnia Sting was the first player from the OHL to be selected, as he was taken with the first overall pick by the Tampa Bay Lightning.

Below are the players selected from OHL teams at the NHL Entry Draft.

See also
 List of OHA Junior A standings
 List of OHL seasons
 2008 NHL Entry Draft
 2008 Memorial Cup
 2007–08 QMJHL season
 2007–08 WHL season
 2007 in ice hockey
 2008 in ice hockey

References

External links
OHL web site
HockeyDB

OHL
Ontario Hockey League seasons